Charles Burns may refer to:
 Charles Burns (cartoonist) (born 1955), American cartoonist and illustrator
 Charles Burns (doctor) (1898–1985), New Zealand doctor
 Charles A. Burns (1863–1930), American businessman
 C. B. Burns (1879–1968), baseball player
 Charles H. Burns (1835–1909), American attorney and politician in New Hampshire
 Charlie Burns (1936–2021), American ice hockey player
 Charlie Burns (footballer) (born 1995), English footballer
 Mr. Burns, full name Charles Montgomery Burns, fictional character from the American animated sitcom The Simpsons

See also
 Charles Byrne (disambiguation)